Tinytown is an unincorporated community in Pulaski County, Virginia, United States.

References

Unincorporated communities in Pulaski County, Virginia
Unincorporated communities in Virginia